Caenognosis incisa is a species of moth of the family Tortricidae. It is found on the Philippines and Christmas Island, as well as in Australia (Queensland).

Adults have white forewings, with brown markings near the apex and the basal half on the inner margin. The hindwings are plain pale brown.

References

Moths described in 1900
Chlidanotini